Cyril Baptiste (November 17, 1949 – August 14, 2006) was an American professional basketball player. He played college basketball for the Creighton Bluejays for two seasons. Baptiste was selected by the Golden State Warriors as an early entrant in the 1971 NBA draft but did not make the team due to a heroin addiction. He played two seasons in the Eastern Basketball Association with the Scranton Apollos.

High school career
Baptiste was a native of Miami, Florida, and attended Archbishop Curley High School. He was selected as a fourth-team Parade All-American in 1968.

College career

Baptiste enrolled at Creighton University with a full athletic scholarship to play basketball for the Bluejays. He was sometimes listed as  but claimed this height was fabricated to "psych out" other teams and he was actually only .

Baptiste toured with the Olympic development team before his sophomore season. Baptiste began to experiment with drugs during his sophomore season as part of an "innocent curiosity". He developed an addiction to heroin and claimed that he played while high his entire junior season, which caused him to lose weight. A decline in his playing performance heightened the suspicions of head coach Eddie Sutton but physicals were unsuccessful in finding anything. Baptiste's interest in his college classes declined and he was assisted with his grades by Creighton until he dropped out of university two weeks after his junior season ended. Sutton lamented in 1989 that he "probably will never get another ballplayer with that much ability" as Baptiste.

Professional career
Baptiste was made eligible for the 1971 NBA draft as part of a hardship round and was considered as a "glamour name". He was selected by the Golden State Warriors and signed a $450,000 contract. Baptiste was suspended in training camp before the 1971–72 NBA season for being "out of condition" and subsequently lost most of his contracted money. The Warriors sent Baptiste to several drug rehabilitation programs and kept him on their suspended list until he was placed on waivers on January 15, 1973.

Baptiste played for the Scranton Apollos of the Eastern Basketball Association during the 1973–74 and 1975–76 seasons where he was sometimes paid only $150 per game. He believed that he could make a return to the National Basketball Association (NBA) despite his history of drug-related arrests and a conviction for arson.

Death
Baptiste died on August 14, 2006, at the age of 56 due to prostate cancer.

Career statistics

College

|-
| style="text-align:left;"| 1969–70
| style="text-align:left;"| Creighton
| 24 || – || – || .514 || – || .561 || 11.7 || – || – || – || 18.9
|-
| style="text-align:left;"| 1970–71
| style="text-align:left;"| Creighton
| 24 || – || 32.7 || .530 || – || .651 || 11.3 || 1.0 || – || – || 20.3
|- class="sortbottom"
| style="text-align:center;" colspan="2"| Career
| 48 || – || 32.7 || .522 || – || .606 || 11.5 || 1.0 || – || – || 19.6

References

External links
College statistics
Creighton Bluejays biography

1949 births
2006 deaths
American men's basketball players
American sportspeople convicted of crimes
Basketball players from Miami
Centers (basketball)
Creighton Bluejays men's basketball players
Golden State Warriors draft picks
Parade High School All-Americans (boys' basketball)
Deaths from prostate cancer